During the 2017–18 season, the Guildford Flames participated in the Elite Ice Hockey League for the first time in their history. It was the 26th year of ice hockey played by the Guildford Flames and the eleventh season under Paul Dixon as head coach.

Team roster

Schedule and results

Pre-season

Regular season

References

External links
Official Guildford Flames website

Guildford Flames seasons